Marquess of Salisbury is a title in the Peerage of Great Britain. It was created in 1789 for the 7th Earl of Salisbury. Most of the holders of the title have been prominent in British political life over the last two centuries, particularly the 3rd Marquess, who served three times as Prime Minister in the late 19th and early 20th centuries.

Background 

This branch of the Cecil family descends from Sir Robert Cecil, the son of the prominent statesman the 1st Baron Burghley, from his second marriage, to Mildred Cooke. His elder half-brother the 2nd Baron Burghley, was created Earl of Exeter in 1605 and is the ancestor of the Marquesses of Exeter. Cecil notably served under Queen Elizabeth I and later King James I as Secretary of State, Chancellor of the Duchy of Lancaster, Lord Privy Seal and Lord High Treasurer. In 1603 he was raised to the Peerage of England as Baron Cecil, of Essendon in the County of Rutland, and the following year he was created Viscount Cranborne. In 1605 he was further created Earl of Salisbury. The last two titles were also in the Peerage of England.

The Earl of Salisbury was succeeded by his son, the second Earl. He represented Weymouth in the House of Commons and also served as Captain of the Honourable Band of Gentlemen Pensioners and as Lord Lieutenant of Hertfordshire and Dorsetshire. His great-grandson, the fourth Earl, converted to Roman Catholicism and in 1689 the House of Commons decided to impeach him for high treason. However, the charges were not brought any further and he was succeeded by his son, the fifth Earl, Lord Lieutenant of Hertfordshire.

History 

The seventh Earl was a politician and served as Lord Chamberlain of the Household for many years. In 1789, he was created Marquess of Salisbury in the Peerage of Great Britain.

He was succeeded by his eldest son, the second marquess. He was a Conservative politician and held office as Lord Privy Seal and Lord President of the Council. Lord Salisbury married as his first wife Frances Mary Gascoyne, daughter of Bamber Gascoyne, in 1821. The same year he assumed by royal licence the additional surname of Gascoyne.

He was succeeded by his third but eldest surviving son, the third marquess. The third marquess was Prime Minister three times, from 1885 to 1886, 1886 to 1892 and 1895 to 1902 and also served four times as foreign secretary. His time as Prime Minister coincided with a great expansion of the British Empire. Lord Salisbury is also remembered as an adherent of the policy of "splendid isolation", the desire to keep Great Britain out of European affairs and alliances. He was also "the last Prime Minister to lead a government from the Lords". Salisbury was offered a dukedom by Queen Victoria in 1886 and 1892, but declined both offers, citing the prohibitive cost of the lifestyle dukes were expected to maintain.

He was succeeded by his eldest son, the fourth marquess. The fourth marquess was also an influential Conservative politician and served as Lord Privy Seal, as President of the Board of Trade, as Lord President of the Council, as Chancellor of the Duchy of Lancaster and as Leader of the House of Lords. Like his father he was regarded as a staunch Conservative and bitterly opposed the Parliament Act 1911, which sought to curtail the powers of the House of Lords.

His eldest son, the fifth marquess, was also a Conservative politician. In 1941 he was summoned to the House of Lords through a writ of acceleration in his father's junior title of Baron Cecil. During his career Lord Salisbury notably held office as Paymaster-General, Secretary of State for the Dominions, Secretary of State for the Colonies, Lord Privy Seal and Leader of the House of Lords. He was an opponent of attempts to reform the House of Lords but was forced to see the Parliament Act 1949 even further limit the power of the House of Lords. However, Lord Salisbury was also behind the Salisbury Convention of 1945, which states that the House of Lords shall not oppose the second reading of any government legislation promised in its election manifesto.

The fifth Marquess was succeeded by his eldest son, the sixth marquess. Although he briefly represented Bournemouth West in Parliament he did not take such an active role in national politics as his predecessors.

As of 2012 the titles are held by the sixth marquess' eldest son, the seventh Marquess, who succeeded in 2003. The seventh marquess is also a Conservative politician. After representing South Dorset in the House of Commons, he was summoned to the House of Lords through a writ of acceleration in his father's junior title of Baron Cecil in 1992 (the last time a writ of acceleration was issued). Lord Salisbury then served under his close political ally John Major as Lord Privy Seal and Leader of the House of Lords from 1994 to 1997. As Leader of the Opposition in the House of Lords after 1997 he played a leading role in negotiating the terms of the House of Lords Act 1999, in which the automatic right of hereditary peers to sit in the upper chamber of Parliament was abolished. Salisbury managed to obtain a compromise with the Labour government of Tony Blair, whereby 92 selected hereditary peers were allowed to remain on an interim basis. However, the compromise was agreed without the knowledge of Conservative leader William Hague and Salisbury was dismissed as Conservative Leader in the House of Lords. The same year, along with all former Leaders of the House of Lords, he was given a life peerage as Baron Gascoyne-Cecil, of Essendon in the County of Rutland, in the Peerage of the United Kingdom, so that he could remain a member of the House of Lords.

Several other members of the Cecil family have gained distinction. Lord Eustace Cecil, fourth son of the second Marquess, was a Lieutenant-Colonel in the Army and Member of Parliament. His son Evelyn Cecil was a Conservative politician and was created Baron Rockley in 1934. The Right Reverend Lord William Gascoyne-Cecil, Bishop of Exeter; Robert Cecil, 1st Viscount Cecil of Chelwood; Lord Edward Cecil; and Hugh Cecil, 1st Baron Quickswood; were all younger sons of the third Marquess. Lord David Cecil, Professor of English Literature at the University of Oxford, was the second son of the fourth Marquess, while the journalist Lord Richard Cecil was the second son of the sixth Marquess. Also, Lady Blanche Gascoyne-Cecil, daughter of the second Marquess, was the mother of Prime Minister Arthur Balfour, 1st Earl of Balfour.

 
The family seats are Hatfield House and  Cranborne Manor. The traditional burial place of the marquesses is the Salisbury Chapel in St Etheldreda Church, Hatfield, Hertfordshire. The 6th Marquess had holdings of 8,500 acres around Hatfield House, and 1,300 acres at Cranborne Manor, Dorset. At the time of his obituary he owned property around Leicester and Leicester Square, London, held by Gascoyne Holdings.

All the marquesses, except the 6th marquess, have been appointed as Knights Companion of the Order of the Garter.

Earls of Salisbury (1605)
Robert Cecil, 1st Earl of Salisbury (1563–1612)
William Cecil, 2nd Earl of Salisbury (1591–1668)
James Cecil, 3rd Earl of Salisbury (1648–1683)
James Cecil, 4th Earl of Salisbury (1666–1694)
James Cecil, 5th Earl of Salisbury (1691–1728)
James Cecil, 6th Earl of Salisbury (1713–1780)
James Cecil, 7th Earl of Salisbury (1748–1823) (created Marquess of Salisbury in 1789)

Marquesses of Salisbury (1789)
James Cecil, 1st Marquess of Salisbury (1748–1823)
James Brownlow William Gascoyne-Cecil, 2nd Marquess of Salisbury (1791–1868)
Robert Arthur Talbot Gascoyne-Cecil, 3rd Marquess of Salisbury (1830–1903)
James Edward Hubert Gascoyne-Cecil, 4th Marquess of Salisbury (1861–1947)
Robert Arthur James Gascoyne-Cecil, 5th Marquess of Salisbury (1893–1972)
Robert Edward Peter Cecil Gascoyne-Cecil, 6th Marquess of Salisbury (1916–2003)
Robert Michael James Gascoyne-Cecil, 7th Marquess of Salisbury (b. 1946)

The heir apparent is the present holder's son Robert Edward William Gascoyne-Cecil, Viscount Cranborne (b. 1970).

Family tree

The Cecils are descended from Sir David Cecil (c. 1460 – 1540), a Welsh landowner,  courtier, and Member of Parliament.  He was born into a Welsh family, the third son of Richard Cecil ap Philip Seisyllt of Alt-yr-Ynys on the border of Herefordshire and Monmouthshire but settled near Stamford, Lincolnshire.  The spelling of the family name as Seisyllt is still similar to how the name is pronounced, Sissill.

See also
Marquess of Exeter
Viscount Cecil of Chelwood
Baron Quickswood
Baron Rockley
Viscount Wimbledon

Notes

References
 
 Burke's Peerage and Baronetage, ed. Charles Mosley, 107th edn., (London 2003), vol.III.
 http://www.cracroftspeerage.co.uk/salisbury1789.htm

Further reading
 Cecil, David. The Cecils of Hatfield House: An English Ruling Family. Houghton Mifflin, 1973.

External links
Hatfield House
Cranborne
Marquessate of Salisbury

Marquessates in the Peerage of Great Britain
!
Noble titles created in 1789
Marquesses of Salisbury